Abel Chapman (1851–1929) was an English, Sunderland-born hunter-naturalist. He contributed in saving the Spanish Ibex from extinction and helped in the establishment of South Africa's first game reserve.

Early life
Abel Chapman was born at 212 High Street, Bishopwearmouth, on 4 October 1851. He was the eldest child of Edward and Jane Chapman and came from a long line of sportsmen who were both accomplished hunters and acclaimed naturalists.

His grandfather, Joseph Crawhall, was an accurate grouse shot in Hexhamshire, as well as being a founder member of the National History Society of Northumbria. His uncle, George Crawhall, was described by Chapman as "a typical sportsman of the old school – the mentor to whom I owe the best grounding in field-craft."

Chapman's first experiences of hunting were in Northumberland, where he fell in love with nature at the same time as shooting. He often made drawings of the birds he saw and shot there. But it was a friend he made at Rugby School, F C Selous, who inspired his lifelong love of travel and adventure – a world away from the moors of Northumberland. Years later, he co-authored a hunting book with Selous, called The Big Game of Africa and Europe.

Adventures and expeditions

Chapman joined his father's firm, the Sunderland-based Lambton Brewery, after leaving Rugby, travelling to Portugal, Spain and Morocco as part of his work in the wine trade. The visits were not confined just to work, however, as they allowed him to broaden his knowledge of wildlife by fishing and shooting.

He also travelled the world as a young man, shooting big game and wild birds for pleasure. Trophies from his hunting trips adorned the walls of his home at Silksworth Hall in the late 19th century. Today his stuffed animals can be seen on display at Sunderland Museum, the National History Museum in London and the Great North Museum in Newcastle.

A trip to Scandinavia in August 1881 proved of particular fascination to him. Indeed, he made a further 23 expeditions to Norway, Sweden and Denmark over the next 17 years. His brother, Alfred Chapman, often accompanied him, and detailed accounts of their adventures were compiled in a book, Wild Norway, in 1897.

Chapman was also fascinated by the wildlife of Spain, striking up a friendship with fellow wildlife enthusiast Walter J Buck. The pair became joint managers of a  stretch of coast at Coto Donana, near the river Guadalquivir, in 1882, which they ran as a nature reserve. It was here Chapman discovered Europe's major breeding ground for flamingos, and helped save the Spanish Ibex – a wild goat – from extinction.

There are now 35,000 Ibex, thanks to hunting restrictions initiated by Chapman. He also co-authored two books with Buck about hunting and fishing at the site, Wild Spain in 1893 and Unexplored Spain in 1910. The land was later acquired by the Spanish and 65 square kilometres are still managed as a nature reserve.

Retirement

Chapman retired from the family firm in 1897, following its takeover by J W Cameron, and moved to Houxty in Northumberland, where he created his own little nature reserve. His smart country home was surrounded by small plantations, moorland and gardens, all designed to attract birds, animals and other naturalists in profusion. Campers at the first Baden-Powell holiday camp in 1908 visited Houxty while staying six miles away in Humshaugh.

Chapman and Buck visited South Africa for the first time in 1899, to take part in big-game hunting. The trip, cut short by the Boer War, proved disappointing, as the Kruger area was over-hunted. After returning to Britain, Chapman drew up plans to protect the Kruger site from further harm by creating a nature reserve. His proposals were sent to the International Convention for the Preservation of Wild Animals in London in 1900 and, shortly after, the Sabi Game Reserve was established.

Over 2,500 square kilometres of land were set aside for the project, and former intelligence officer James Stevenson-Hamilton was appointed as the first warden. By 1903 the park was such a success that it was extended, and a second reserve – the Shingwedzi – was opened nearby later that year. Today, the Sabi Reserve, a core part of the Kruger National Park, is a tourist hot spot.

Chapman was a member of the Society for the Preservation of the Wild Fauna of the Empire. Chapman died at Houxty in January 1929.

Bibliography
 Wild Spain. Abel Chapman and Walter J. Buck. London, Gurney and Jackson, 1893.
 Unexplored Spain. Abel Chapman and Walter J. Buck. London, Edward Arnold, 1910.
 Savage Sudan. Its wild tribes, big game and bird-life. London, Gurney and Jackson, 1921. 17 x 24 cm, XX + 452 pages, 30 plates.
 The Borders and beyond. Arctic, Cheviot, Tropic. London, Gurney and Jackson, 1924. 15,5 x 23 cm, 490 pages, 19 plates.

References

External links

 

1851 births
1929 deaths
British conservationists
British hunters
People from Sunderland